The Cabinet of Kuwait is the chief executive body of the State of Kuwait. The 41st cabinet in the history of Kuwait was appointed on 5 October 2022. On 5 October 2022, Amir of Kuwait His Highness Sheikh Nawaf Al-Ahmad Al-Jaber Al-Sabah assigned His Highness Sheikh Ahmad Nawaf Al-Ahmad Al-Sabah as Prime Minister. The Amir has also assigned the Prime Minister to refer the cabinet line-up for their appointment. On 5 October 2022, the new cabinet line up was announced after the Amir approved in an Amiri order. Due to strong backlash from MPs and citizens about some of the recurring ministers returning, on 6 October 2022, the Prime Minister tendered a letter of governmental resignation to the Crown Prince a day after its formation, making it the shortest-lived government in Kuwaiti history. The Prime Minister then met with MPs to take their ideas about the government's new formation in order to ease tensions between the government and parliament.

References

Government of Kuwait
Cabinets established in 2022
Current governments